Events in the year 1950 in Norway.

Incumbents
 Monarch – Haakon VII
 Prime Minister – Einar Gerhardsen (Labour Party)

Events

 2 January – Postbanken (lit. The Post Bank) starts its operations.
 15 November – 14 people killed in the Hjuksebø train disaster.
 1 December – Population Census: 3,278,546 inhabitants in Norway.
 The official inauguration of the Oslo City Hall.

Popular culture

Sports

Music

Film

Literature

September 18 – Henrik Rytter, Norwegian dramatist, lyricist and translator (born 1887)

Notable births

January 

5 January – Halvdan Sivertsen, singer
9 January – Maryon Eilertsen, actress and theatre director (died 2015).
22 January – Tomm Kristiansen, author and journalist
25 January – Svein Gjedrem, economist, Governor of the Central Bank of Norway
28 January – Gro Anita Schønn, singer (died 2001).

March 
7 March – Eva M. Nielsen, politician
11 March – Ketil Egge, actor and theatre director (died 1997).

April 
28 April – Martin Asphaug, film director and screenwriter

May 
3 May – Morten Krogvold, photographer
7 May – Kjell Torriset, painter and graphic artist.
11 May – Jan Erik Langangen, businessperson
24 May – Sissel Rønbeck, politician
28 May – Anne Margrethe Larsen, politician

June 

10 June – Mimmi Bæivi, politician
11 June – Kristin Bølgen Bronebakk, civil servant
19 June – Wenche Kvamme, singer and actress (died 2019).

July 
13 July – Iben Sandemose, illustrator, children's writer, playwright and biographer.
22 July – Elisabeth Eide, journalist, teacher, novelist and non-fiction writer.

August 
4 August – Inga Magistad, diplomat
8 August – Synne Skouen, composer
19 August – Kari Bøge, Swedish-born Norwegian poet, novelist, short story writer, children's writer and illustrator.
25 August 1950 – Karen-Marie Ellefsen, journalist and sports reporter.

September 

5 September – Bjørn Skagestad, actor
5 September – Kari Svendsen, singer, banjo player and revue artist.
7 September – Anne Grosvold, journalist.
10 September – Tom Lund, football player
26 September – Ida Børresen, civil servant.

October 
1 October – Sigbjørn Johnsen, politician
12 October – Knut Knudsen, racing cyclist
28 October – Beate Ellingsen, designer.

November 
5 November – Thorbjørn Jagland, politician
5 December – Berit Brørby, politician

December 
21 December – Lillebjørn Nilsen, singer-songwriter

Notable deaths

9 January – Elise Sem, barrister (born 1870)
22 February – Halvor Møgster, Olympic sailor (born 1875)
11 February – Anders Sandvig, dentist and ethnologist (born 1862)
4 March – Johanne Dybwad, actress and stage producer (born 1867)
6 March – Vilhelm Dybwad, songswriter, barrister and writer of comedies and revues (born 1863)
5 April – William Farre (71), composer.
6 April – Signe Lund (81), composer.
27 May – Gunvald Aus, engineer (born 1851)
10 June – Karen Platou, politician (born 1879)
26 June – Hans Jørgen Darre-Jenssen, engineer and politician (born 1864)
27 July – Marta Steinsvik, author and translator (born 1877)
3 August – Kristian Laake, Commanding General of the Norwegian Army (born 1875)
10 September – Alfred Larsen, Olympic sailor (born 1863).
14 September – Marius Eriksen, Olympic gymnast (born 1886).
3 October – Betzy Kjelsberg, politician and feminist (born 1866)
22 December – Bernhoff Hansen, wrestler and Olympic gold medallist (born 1877)

See also

References

External links